Wappenbury is a small village and civil parish in the English county of Warwickshire. Located on the north bank of the River Leam Wappenbury is almost entirely inside the ramparts of an Iron Age hill fort. The population details can be found under Eathorpe. The nearest town is Leamington Spa, some 5 miles to the south west of Wappenbury.  During the Second World War its vicar was William Purcell Witcutt. Roman pottery and kilns have been found in the village; which is only 1 mile from the Fosse Way.

References

External links

Genealogy links for Wappenbury
Brief details of the hill fort

Villages in Warwickshire